VIVE, sometimes referred to as HTC Vive, is a virtual reality brand of HTC Corporation. It consists of hardware like its titular virtual reality headsets and accessories, virtual reality software and services, and initiatives that promote applications of virtual reality in sectors like business and arts.

The brand's first virtual reality headset, simply called HTC Vive, was introduced as part of a collaboration with Valve Corporation, implementing its SteamVR hardware and software ecosystem. It was unveiled during HTC's Mobile World Congress keynote in March 2015. Development kits were sent out in August and September 2015, and the first consumer version of the device was released in April 2016. It has since been succeeded by newer models with upgraded specifications. HTC has also released accessories that integrate with the Vive and SteamVR, including sensors for motion capture and facial capture.

In February 2022, HTC unveiled Viverse, a metaverse ecosystem comprising its 5G products, Vive VR devices, and related initiatives, as well as partners like ENGAGE and VRChat. VIVERSE is said to offer multiple routes into the metaverse by providing accessibility to virtual worlds from non-VIVE and non-VR devices like smartphones through software tools like VIVE Connect. Parental controls will be available for metaverse users through a new app called VIVE Guardian.

Development 
Prototypes of a Valve-produced virtual reality system were demonstrated during 2014. On 23 February 2015, Valve announced SteamVR and that it would demonstrate a "SteamVR hardware system" at the 2015 Game Developers Conference. HTC officially unveiled its device, Vive, during its Mobile World Congress keynote on 1 March 2015.

During his Immersed 2015 keynote, Chief Content Officer for HTC Phil Chen explained that he "stumbled upon VR" and later, HTC met Valve, which turned out to be "serendipity". Chen also explained that HTC and Valve don't have a clear dividing line between each of their responsibilities, and HTC is very much a partner in the research and development process.

History 
At International CES in January 2016, HTC and Valve unveiled a near-final hardware revision of the device, known as HTC Vive Pre. Preorders started on 29 February 2016 at 10:00 a.m. EST. In March, Valve and HTC announced that they also planned to distribute development models of the Vive for free to game developers who register online.

In June 2016, HTC announced the release of their 'Business Edition' of the Vive for US$1,200 which would include a Professional Use License, a 12-month Commercial Warranty, access to an exclusive support line, a 5-meter (16 ft) cable extension kit, and it included the Deluxe Audio Strap.

HTC announced an updated revision of the Vive known as the Vive Pro in January 2018, which featured a higher resolution display and other design tweaks for comfort. In 2019, HTC released the Vive Cosmos, which features inside-out motion tracking without external base stations, and also supports interchangeable faceplates with different functionality.

Hardware
HTC Vive implements "room-scale" virtual reality, whereby a user can walk freely around a play area rather than be constrained to a stationary position. The controllers and headset use a positional tracking system; multiple external base station units (also referred to as "lighthouses") are installed in the play area, which each contain an array of LED lights, and two infrared lasers. The lasers are attached to rotating spinners which sweep the play area vertically and horizontally with timed pulses (similarly to their namesakes). The headsets, controllers, and other compatible accessories contain photosensors which detect the LED lights from the base stations, and then compare them with the timing of the laser sweeps in order to determine their relative position in 3D space.

The first-generation HTC Vive headset contains two OLED display panels with a resolution of 1080×1200 per-eye, with a refresh rate of 90 Hz and a 110 degree field of view. It contains a accelerometer, gyroscope and proximity sensor, and a front-facing camera used for the "Chaperone" feature, which can display the boundaries of the user's chosen perimeter or the view of the camera in order to help guide the user away from objects and walls in their play area. 

The headset must be connected to a supported PC using a "link box", which contains USB 3.0, HDMI, and power connectors. The Vive initially required computers running Microsoft Windows. In February 2017, support was added for Linux, followed by support for macOS in June 2017. However, SteamVR support for macOS was discontinued by Valve in 2020, with the company stating that it planned to focus solely on Linux and Windows moving forward.

Controllers 
The Vive uses motion controllers referred to as "wands", which contain circular trackpads similar to the Steam Controller, a side "grip" button, a trigger, and an infrared sensor ring for tracking the base stations. They are rated for a battery life of six hours. Later models of the wand controllers implement SteamVR 2.0 tracking, and are coloured in blue to match the Vive Pro.

The Vive Cosmos ships with a different controller due to its Inside out tracking; unlike the "wand" controllers, they are nearly identical in design to the Oculus Touch controllers, with each controller having two face buttons, an analog stick, a trigger and bumper, and a grip button.

Product lines

Vive Pro 

On 8 January 2018, HTC unveiled an upgraded Vive model known as HTC Vive Pro. It features higher-resolution displays, now at 1440×1600 resolution per-eye, along with a second outward-facing camera, attachable over-ear speakers, a microphone for noise cancellation analysis, and a refreshed design with a more "balanced" form, lighter weight, and a sizing dial. It also featured a new navy blue-coloured exterior. It uses Mini DisplayPort as a display connection instead of HDMI.

The Vive Pro was sold alongside the original HTC Vive as a high-end model; initially, the headset was sold standalone without base stations or controllers, as it was intended as a drop-in replacement for the original Vive in an existing setup. HTC later released bundles of the Vive Pro with base stations and controllers, with the "Starter Kit" including the original controllers and base stations, and the "Full Kit" featuring updated SteamVR 2.0 base stations and controllers, which have improved performance and tracking volume (supporting spaces of up to 10 square metres in size) but are not backwards compatible with the original HTC Vive headset and controllers.

In January 2019 at CES, HTC unveiled the Vive Pro Eye, which adds built-in eye tracking.
On 11 May 2021, HTC unveiled the Vive Pro 2, which upgrades its screens to 2448×2448 resolution per-eye (marketed as 5K resolution), with a 120-degree field of view, 120 Hz refresh rate, and Display Stream Compression support. HTC promoted that the displays had "minimal motion blur" and that they had "virtually eliminated" the screen-door effect. It carries backwards compatibility with all existing HTC Vive and SteamVR-compatible accessories and controllers. As with the original Pro, it was initially released as a standalone headset only. The Full Kit version of the Vive Pro 2 began shipping in October 2021.

Vive Focus 
The Vive Focus is a standalone headset which does not require a computer to operate. It targets the business market, and supports a small, remote-like controller, or motion controllers using three degrees of freedom. The headset uses a Qualcomm Snapdragon 835 system-on-chip. It was initially released exclusively in China, and launched internationally in November 2018.

In February 2019, HTC announced the Vive Focus Plus, a refresh model with updated motion controllers that support six degrees of freedom, and design tweaks for improved weight distribution.

A direct successor known as the Vive Focus 3 was unveiled in May 2021. It uses the Qualcomm Snapdragon XR2 system-on-chip, has a per-eye resolution of 2448×2448 at 90 Hz, a 120-degree field of view, and improved comfort. It supports Vive Business Streaming for playing VR content from a computer.

Vive Cosmos 

Also at CES 2019, HTC announced the Vive Cosmos, which began shipping on 3 October 2019.

Similarly to the Oculus Quest and Rift S, it uses "inside-out" tracking, whereby the controllers are tracked using six cameras in the front faceplate of the headset rather than external base stations. Due to its use of inside-out tracking, the Vive Cosmos does not use the wand controllers used by other Vive models, and ships with a different controller that is nearly identical in design and functionality to the second-generation Oculus Touch controllers.

The Cosmos features a 90 Hz LCD display, with a 110-degree field of review and overall resolution of 2880×1700. It supports interchangeable faceplates to change its functionality, such as an External Tracking faceplate (which supports tracking with base stations).  The faceplate can also be lifted up like a visor, allowing the user to see the outside world without fully taking off the headset.

It uses a software platform known as Vive Reality System rather than SteamVR, with the "Lens" user interface and integration with HTC's Viveport platform. In February 2020, HTC announced additional Vive Cosmos SKUs, with different faceplates and accessories included for specific use cases;

 Vive Cosmos Elite, a high-end model with the External Tracking faceplate, and two Lighthouse base stations and wand controllers included.
 Vive Cosmos XR, a version of the Cosmos with a faceplate containing "high-quality XR passthrough cameras", designed for enhanced mixed reality experiences.
 Vive Cosmos Play, an entry-level model with only four cameras on the faceplate.

Vive Flow

Hardware and accessories 
HTC Vive headsets support a number of accessories
 Vive Tracker: A motion tracking device that can be attached to physical accessories or limbs so they can be tracked via the base stations. Vive Trackers feature a connector that can be used to communicate with the accessory it is attached to. On launch, the Vive Tracker was sold as a standalone product, and in bundles with accessories and games designed to integrate with it, such as the Hyper Blaster (a light gun-style controller), and a racquet designed for sports games. As of 2021 there have been 3 separate iterations of the Vive tracker which have fine-tuned and optimised battery life as well as tracking performance.
 Deluxe Audio Strap: In June 2017, HTC released the Deluxe Audio Strap, a replacement head strap for Vive headsets which includes integrated over-ear speakers (similar in design to the first-generation Oculus Rift), and padding to improve weight distribution and comfort.
 Vive Wireless Adapter: The Vive Wireless Adapter was launched as an accessory in September 2018 for the original Vive and Vive Pro, which allows the headset to be operated wirelessly with a battery pack and transmitter, using V band WiGig technology. In November 2016, HTC had also unveiled a third-party wireless kit for the Vive known as TPCast, which was developed by a startup funded through the Vive X accelerator program.
Vive Facial Tracker: In March 2021, HTC announced and released the Vive Facial Tracker, an accessory attached to the headset containing infrared-illuminated cameras for facial motion capture. The functionality can be used in applications such as social worlds, and combined with the eye tracking system on supported models. 
The aGlass lenses are alternate eyepieces developed by 7invensun as part of the Vive X program, which add eye tracking support to the headset. 
The Vive also supports other SteamVR-compatible controllers and accessories, such as the Index Controllers.

Games and software 

Most HTC Vive headsets implement the SteamVR platform, and support all games and software which use it. HTC also operates its own first-party storefront known as Viveport, which includes a subscription-based service with unlimited access to participating games, as well as curated storefronts intended for commercial clients such as entertainment centers and workplaces.

A tool known as Revive was developed to allow Oculus Rift-specific software to operate on HTC Vive.

Adoption 

Valve released its OpenVR software development kit (SDK), an updated version of its Steamworks VR API with documentation and examples of how to build software that supports SteamVR hardware. It provides support for the HTC Vive Developer Edition, including the SteamVR controller and Lighthouse.

SteamVR was launched with native support for Unity on its platform.

On 30 April 2015, Epic Games announced support for Valve's SteamVR technology, allowing developers to create VR projects with Unreal Engine 4 for the HTC Vive. Epic said that SteamVR is completely integrated into Unreal Engine 4 across Blueprint visual scripting and native code, meaning projects can be built without being dependent on programmer support if needed. Epic's own Showdown tech demo can already be experienced on SteamVR using the Vive headset.

In July 2016, VR news website Road to VR used game session figures from the Steam VR platform to estimate that approximately 100,000 Vive headsets had been shipped since launch. In the same month, SensoMotoric Instruments (SMI), a computer vision company, integrated its eye tracking technology in the HTC Vive to turn it into a dedicated eye tracking solution for research and professional applications. In November 2016, Vive announced that it would begin the first retail sales of its headsets at JB Hi-Fi and Harvey Norman stores in Australia later that month.

On 23 November 2016, HTC announced that the Vive was sold at a profit and that HTC Vive sales were "much higher" than 140,000.

Since the launch of Vive, HTC has increasingly targeted its products towards the business market. In 2021, Vive General Manager Dan O'Brien stated that "the consumer market has gravitated toward these artificially subsidized price points that really only one company in the world Facebook has any tolerance for", and that "the enterprise and professional market is a very healthy and rapidly growing market where we can bring real value and solutions."

See also 
 Oculus (brand)
 Valve Index
 VirtualLink
 Metaverse

References

External links 

 

HTC computer peripherals
HTC Corporation
Products introduced in 2016
Valve Corporation
Virtual reality headsets